is a shōjo manga series by Riko Miyagi. It was serialized in Japan by the publishing company Shueisha in the Margaret from 2002 to 2006 and collected in 12 Tankōbon volumes.

Story
Hiyo Osora failed the entrance exam to the high school she chose, but somehow she receives a strange acceptance letter to SM Academy (Saint Monster Academy) -- which she hadn't even applied to. Thinking that her father, an alumnus of the school, must have sent in a reference letter for her, she decides to go to the school. When she first arrives there, while being distracted by the flowers and green nature around her, two hooded people (Yuki and Jiro) snatch her and bring her to the school president, Kurou Tenma. Fortunately, all that was simply a type of hazing for all new members of the school.

She is surprised to find the school crawling with people who are actually monsters in disguise! The next big shock is being told by Kurou himself that she is his fiancée! She is so shocked she faints. She then wakes up and finds out that Kurou has gone as far as having her room connected to his. The only way she can get out is in his arms with his wings or as we discover later on, a trap door down an enormous amount of stairs (since his room is located in a tower).

Characters

Main Characters
Hiyoko Osora
Hiyo Osora is 15 years old and attends SM Academy (Saint Monster Academy). Her genre/type of monster is crow, specifically, a white crow which was considered to be a legend. Despite being a white crow monster, she is actually quite useless, often needing someone else to save her in times of trouble. She is actually only half monster from her father, Shou Hiyo, and half human from her mother, Kyoko Hiyo. Her parents are divorced because of her father's doll face high school appearance, which he can't help, since he's a monster. Hiyo's life is in constant danger because there are dangerous people that are out to get her white feathers. It is said that whoever gets a white crow feather will be granted any wish they desire. The person that usually ends up saving her is Kurou. She secretly harbors feelings for him, but will repeatedly deny that she is his fiancé. Kurou asked Hiyo if he could just call her Hiyo, and she said yes. Later on in the story Hiyo no longer denies her feelings. She adores food, video games, and everything cute. Ironically, she has a fear of heights; she developed the fear because she didn't know she had wings until she went to SM Academy. When Hiyo was still young, a powerful witch erased all her childhood memories, and that is why she doesn't know how to fly until she attends SM Academy. Hiyo also forgot that she was the one who proposed to Kurou although she doesn't remember it due to the witch erasing her memory. Hiyo has many people who adore her and love her, but the only person she truly loves is Kurou.

Kurou Tenma
Kurou Tenma is 15 years old and attends SM Academy. His genre type is crow, though unlike Hiyo, his wings are a normal black colour. Kurou actually owns a crow named Eigatsu who has been with him since he was little and is friends with Hiyo as well. He is a confident, strong, and at times cocky person. He is regarded as one of the strongest student presidents of all time (the strongest was Hiyo's father). He loves Hiyo very much, and vows to protect her. He is distant with his whole family except his grandfather because when he was young, he failed to grow wings and was abandoned by everyone. When Kurou was 3, he met Hiyo. Due to the fact he couldn't grow wings and the fact his family abandoned him, he had lost all will to live. Hiyo really wanted to befriend Kurou at first, but Kurou was stubborn and rejected the offer, but was later convinced to be her friend when she "proposed to him" saying she's going be his bride. Later they climbed up a mountain, and when they reached the summit, Hiyo fell off, and Kurou jumped after her to save her and received his wings. After meeting Hiyo and receiving his wings, he regained his will to live, hence Kurou believes that Hiyo saved him. Kurou is the demon king because of his unbelievable strength and power when Kurou gets mad. He can destroy anything he wants and may lose contact with reality. To Kurou, Hiyo is the most important person to him and he would do anything to save her, even risking his own life. Kurou is over protective of Hiyo and can get very jealous. In recent chapters, he wants to become stronger so that he can protect Hiyo. He wanted to protect Hiyo so much that he was willing to destroy mankind so no one would be able to hurt her. But in the end he gave up the idea so he could be with Hiyo and with his family and friends. In the last chapter they finally make love. Also in the first chapter he said Hiyo was his fiancee but she denied, telling her that Hiyo's father agreed to let Kurou marry her, showed her a video and page, but really Hiyo was the one that proposed all along. Kurou also has a sister named Chiya who would like to marry him because she sees the way he treats Hiyo, and the Mrs. Tenmo agrees (and yes, crow siblings can marry each other). That is sorted out but also Maki Tamaki loves Kurou and impersonates Hiyo.

The Student Union
Yamata Ken
Student Union VP. His true form is a snake. Sadly, no matter how hard he tries, he always turns out second-best, losing either to Kurou or the Queen. Yamata constantly begs Kurou to focus on administrative problems, sometimes using it as an excuse to be with Hiyo. Yamata is very handsome if he doesn't wear glasses and if he messes up his hair. He is also in love with Hiyo. Hiyo thinks he's interesting and likes to hang out with him. They love to play video games and watch movies together.

Issori Usukuchi
Student Union General Secretary, junior high 3rd year. He is an Ittan-momen.

Makio Kawamura
Student Union accountant, senior high 2nd year. He is a Kappa and thus hates incredibly dry conditions. He is the smartest student in the second year.

Fellow Students
Jiro Gin
Jiro Gin is Kurou's best friend. Kurou first thought that Jiro was a dog at first due to his ears. They were six at the time. Jiro's true form is a wolf. They usually call him Jin. Just like Kurou, Jin's also loves to bully people, especially the smaller ones. However he's also kind hearted and always cheers people up. Jin is simple minded and has known Kurou very well ever since childhood. Jin's also a first year student at SM. Also, whenever he is provoked, or at sometimes lustful, his ears will appear, especially if he's thinking about Hiyo, whom he has a crush on. In an omake, Jin had first met Yuki at his first year at SM. He thought that Yuki was a girl at first and called him his first love. The illusion did not last as Yuki took off his shirt. Jin's father was the vice president of SM's Student Union when Hiyo's dad (rumored to be the strongest president of SM) was studying. He is friends along with Yuki's mother and Hiyo's father. During summer vacation, he admits that Komugi (Hiyo's human friend) is cute and Kurou asks him if he's ever thought of dating her. Then, Gin rescues Komugi from a crumbling building and the two sneak off to the beach together. It is also shown that his mother is Yuki's aunt so she is a fox not a wolf.

Yuki Snow-White
Yuki is also Kouro's best friend. He is a Northern European Snowman type monster. He's very popular among girls and has been expelled for trying to seduce a teacher. He's calm and just like Jin and Kurou, he's also very powerful. Yuki is often around the main characters and loves to fool around with people. Yuki's mother was the queen of the girl's dorms when she attended SM and is the most beautiful queen in the history of SM. Yuki knows K. Bradford from the main SM campus. Yuki seems to be able to freeze people into ice. K. Bradford hates Yuki because he's been able to impress more girls than K.
Maki Tamaki
Maki is a cat-girl and at first has a strong liking for Kurou. She is very jealous of Hiyo and extremely stuck up. She can transform into other people. Later she reveals to Hiyoko that she doesn't harbor actual feelings for Kurou. She just likes anyone who is a crow. When she and the other people in the academy find out that Hiyo is the white crow, she declares herself as Hiyoko's best friend. She also asks Hiyo to set her up with Hiyo's father.

Haitani Tadao
He is Tamaki's slave and she calls him Aichu. He's a mouse and people make fun of him because of that. He seems to have a crush on her.

Hitomi
She is the Guardian of the girls' dormitory. She was admitted to SM Academy 100 years ago, but never attended school. She refused to leave the female dormitory because the guest room was too comfortable to live in. Only the current and future queen can see her. She likes Hiyo and wants her to play with her forever. She makes a deal with Kurou that if Hiyo says she likes him, she'll let her go, if not, Hiyo will keep her accompanied forever. Hiyo couldn't decide and dashed out of Hitomi's Invincible Guarding Barrier leaving everyone dumbstruck because even the queen couldn't break it yet she did it easily. After that she started to attend school to be close to Hiyo. She seems to be nice only to Hiyo and wants everyone else to respect her, due to her age. She is childish in looks and behavior, such as her collection of stuffed animals or her tea parties. Hitomi, Miyako, and Semu have a connection due to their common interest in each other's stuffed animals.

Yatsude Keiko
The queen of the female dormitory. She seems to be like an older sister to Hitomi. Other students call her "Spider" due to her ability to shoot out webs. When we first meet Keiko, she is actually someone else pretending to be her while she was absent. She is very beautiful and captivates many male students of SM Academy. She is also very smart, being one of Yazaki's academic opponents.

Koma Inukami
Mako's twin. She has light hair and wears her pigtail on the left side. She and her sister tries to get Hiyo's feathers to allow Konta to become an adult. She is a dog kami.

Mako Inukami
Koma's twin. She has dark hair and wears her pigtail on the right side. She is also a dog spirit and has the same goal as her sister.

Konta Inari
Koma's and Mako's "good friend"(slave). He's a fox, but he has self-esteem issues. He was born with a pure fox bloodline, but inherited half of its power. But once he's able to transform he's very strong. When he helps Hiyo escape from the Inukami twins he transforms into his monster form. The Inukami twins are disappointed because his true form is a handsome adult. When Kurou arrives with Yuki and Jin, he kidnaps Hiyo because he loves her and doesn't want to hand her over. He escapes into the mirror, which leads into a dimension where only foxes can enter. He takes Hiyo as his bride because it is tradition that when a fox grows up, he must take his bride to his home. But he transforms back into his child-like form because his soul isn't mature. He becomes a supporting character from then on. He was the one who opened the hole to the mortal world when Hiyo disappeared and allowed Gin to accidentally kidnap Komugi.

Tenma Family
Hayate Tenma
Hayate is Kurou's older brother who wants to get everything that belongs to Kurou because he believes that Kurou must die. Hayate will do anything to get his mother's attention, but because his other brothers outdo him easily he's out of luck. He has a liking for professor Kamako, but he doesn't realize that professor Kamako is a transvestite and no one seems to tell him.

Chiya Tenma
Chiya Tenma is a stubborn and strong willed crow with black wings. She is a pop idol in the monster world, along with her friend Totoko. It is later revealed that she is Kurou's younger sister whom he was separated from after birth. She goes to school at Hyakki Academy. She and Totoko are friends with Haine. She falls in love with Kurou at first sight and arranges the marriage between her and Kurou with their parents. They broke up eventually because she thinks Kurou is weird for choosing Hiyo over her. She seems jealous of Hiyo's relationship with Kurou at the beginning but after a while she gives up. Chiya has the power to erase memories. Chiya actually likes Haine but Haine thinks she's just his friend.

Crow King
The grandfather who raised Kurou. He actually raised Hiyo's father as well. When he was young he stood up against Kurou's father and enjoyed raising children. At first he doesn't seem like a great crow, but he is actually very strong. He was the one who trained Kurou and accepted him even when he did not have wings.

Miyako Tenma
Miyako is known as the Night Priestess, the strongest deity in the East, with the power to see the past and the future of everyone, with the exception of herself, Shou, and Hiyo. She is the wife of Yasha Tenma and the mother of Hayate, Kurou, and Chiya. Because she is worshiped like a god, Miyako is quite often insulting to everyone she doesn't like, including Shou's ex-wife and daughter. She is small in stature, even smaller than Hiyo, and acts very childish in most situations. She is revealed to be the Goddess who created this world. Miyako shows a deep affection for Hiyo's father, Shou, but Shou insists that Miyako sincerely loves Yasha. Her affection for Shou comes from the fact that she can't see his future, indicating that he is stronger than her. She says she has no feelings not even for her husband or children but it is proven wrong for she wanted to kill Hiyo instead of Kurou to save him; she also sent Yasha away to protect him from what would happen. Since the first time she met Yasha she knew she would kill him and tried to distance herself from him but he is the first person that she has met that was not afraid of her. When she tries to kill Kurou after he turned into the Demon King, Yasha stops her and dies. After the new world was created, Miyako and Yasha are reunited.

Yasha Tenma
Father of Kurou, Hayate and Chiya. Yasha is the elder brother of Shou Osora, but not by blood. He was very close friends with his adoptive brother up until the meeting of the Dark Priestess, Miyako. Yasha fell in love at first sight. Unfortunately, Yasha was rejected by Miyako, because of her feelings towards Shou. However, Shou turned down Miyako because she was childish, but in fact he was also aware of Yasha's strong feelings for her. It seemed that Shou was betraying Yasha more and more. He disapproves of Kurou and Hiyo's "engagement" and has a deep hatred towards humans, since they killed his mother. Yasha loves Miyako unconditionally, and leaves her when she told him she was tired of him. He was the one who saved Kurou when Miyako was about to kill him, simply because he is his and Miyako's son. He dies at the hand of Miyako like she had foreseen, but is reunited with her in the new world.

Other
Shou Osora
Shou is Hiyo's father and former student body president of SM Academy. Like Kurou, he is a black crow. He is very cheerful and humble, and believes that Hiyo and Kurou should be together, when many believe that they should not. It is revealed by Kurou that Shou was the strongest student body president (stronger than Kurou's father) in his high school years (many claim that he is one of the strongest monsters). In fact, he was so fearful that during his time in the treasure hunt that took place between SM and Hyakki Academy, Hyakki immediately gave up without a fight (he was very polite in asking for the treasure). His high school appearance led to his and Kyoko's divorce, yet he is still in love with her. Kyoko was the reason he did not turn into the Demon King and destroy the world like he had wanted when he was young. He is quite close to Hiyo and is in good terms with Kurou. In the last chapter, he is shown to be 10,000 years old and also has one black and one white wing, something that not even the Miyako could explain, leaving them to believe he is a god. In the new world that Hiyo and Kurou created, he and Kyoko are married and did not divorce.

Semu
He is the school doctor. He has a bunch of toys who act like servants to him. Although he looks like a cute little boy, every time he sees a girl who he likes, he transforms into an adult. Whenever anyone looks into his eyes when he's in his adult form, they turn into stone. (This can be solved by pouring boiling water on the statue). He is actually the descendant of the legendary Medusa. Semu, Hitomi, and Kurou's mother Miyako all have extensive collections of stuffed toys.

L Bradford
L is a vampire that transferred in the SM University with his cousins, J and K Bradford. They are looking for the white crow who is actually Hiyoko. In chapter 51, Hiyoko and he fell in a cave then he accidentally sucked her blood, he sucked a lot so Kurou and his friends thought that Hiyoko will be a vampire, Kurou became mad and tore his wings, but Hiyoko still, became a white crow. He falls in love with Hiyoko. Like Haine, L is despised by Kurou and will do anything to keep L away from Hiyoko, which proves to be difficult as Hiyoko offered to let L drink her blood. In recent chapter, he is to succeed the vampire clan, but his grandfather, who is the current leader, did something to him, and in the end of chapter 73, he is shown to have drunk the blood of many girl vampires, and is saying that they will not satisfy him. He says that only his "white" bride will be able to satisfy him. He is recently shown to be a lot taller and more evil than his other self. It is recently implied that he is the true demon king rather than Kurou. It is seen that A, L's,K's and J's Uncle, absorbed his soul and took L's body [which was A's in the first place, considering L was a clone of A.] He later was able to return to his true self thanks to Hiyoko.

K Bradford
K is L's cousin, he envies Yuki because all the girls like Yuki better than they do him. He planned to take Hiyo too, but later on, he leaves with J. He has a crush on Kinuko the "queen" in the girls dorm. In recent chapter, he burst through the window in a conversation between the director of the school and Kurou and Hiyoko. He is injured and begins telling them that something went wrong with L, and that Hiyoko must save L. His mother was a human who got pregnant by a vampire. He worships L because l didn't mind he was from a human mother.

J Bradford
J is a cousin of L too. He planned to take Hiyoko too, but ends up leaving with K. J became afraid of Kurou after he attempted to fight Kurou, in order to kidnap Hiyoko, and was defeated instantly, with little effort from Kurou. He has a crush on Hitomi, due to her adorable appearance, but is slightly bothered by her age. His mother was a human who got pregnant by a vampire.

Komugi Taneda
Hiyoko's friend since junior-high. Komugi has had a strong sixth sense since she and Hiyoko were younger (a trait probably inherited from her mother), and when Hiyoko returns to the human world for a while she instantly notices that Haine is not human. After being mistaken for Hiyoko, Gin pulls her through Konta's dimensional rift where she finds out that Hiyoko is half monster and that all monsters aren't evil. When Hiyo and her friends comes for a vacation in the human world, Komugi and Hiyo are trapped inside a barrier Shou has made, and Gin comes to her rescue. She confesses to Gin and says she doesn't care if he is a monster.

Maboroshidou Haine
Haine is the Student body president of Hyakki Academy. He is a crow with grey wings, this is believed to have happened because he is half-human. He captured Hiyoko in chapter 28 because of the contest (during the annual treasure hunt). He eventually finds out that Hiyoko is really the legendary white crow. Haine at first appears to be lecherous, but he helps Hiyoko and her mother escape from a weird monster. He falls in love with Hiyoko and arranges their marriage, with her mother's approval. However, Hiyoko's father claims that since Kurou's engagement with Hiyoko is still standing it means that Haine's engagement is not legitimate. Haine is also able to cook really well. His personality is rough at first, but, as he begins to fall in-love with Hiyoko, his personality becomes more pleasant which adds humor to many chapters. Though Chiya and Totoko left him to go to SM Academy for a while, they are reunited later. He is seen as a great cook, such as when he cooked for Hiyo and her family during her disappearance from SM Academy.

Marilyn
Marilyn is as powerful as Miyako, she has the ability to eat a spirit or a soul. She is the equivalent of a Night Priestess in the West. She is the one who turned Kurou into the Demon King. She thought she would be able to control him and create a new world but she was also erased in the end. When Hiyo and Kurou created a new world, she is alive again. Marilyn posed as a maid in the Bradford Vampire Clan but seems to always be in that attire. She is also small in stature such as many other powerful figures in the series. Marilyn has a somehow powerful nature because she helped Kurou turn into the demon king.

Volumes
  published in December 2002
  published in April 2003
  published in August 2003
  published in December 2003
  published in April 2004
  published in August 2004
  published in December 2004
  published in March 2005
  published in July 2005
  published in December 2005
  published in April 2006
  published in May 2006

External links
 Official site 
 

Shōjo manga
Romance anime and manga
Supernatural anime and manga
2002 manga
Works about tengu